German submarine U-350 was a Type VIIC U-boat of Nazi Germany's Kriegsmarine during World War II.

She carried out no patrols. She did not sink or damage any ships.

She was sunk by US bombs in Hamburg on 30 March 1945.

Design
German Type VIIC submarines were preceded by the shorter Type VIIB submarines. U-350 had a displacement of  when at the surface and  while submerged. She had two shafts and two  propellers.

U-350 was fitted with five  torpedo tubes (four fitted at the bow and one at the stern), fourteen torpedoes, one  SK C/35 naval gun, 220 rounds, and two twin  C/30 anti-aircraft guns. The boat had a complement of between forty-four and sixty.

Service history
The submarine was laid down on 15 February 1943 at the Nordseewerke yard at Emden as yard number 222, launched on 17 August and commissioned on 7 October under the command of Oberleutnant zur See Erich Niester. She served with the 22nd U-boat Flotilla from 7 October 1943 and the 31st flotilla from 1 March. U-350 was sunk on 30 March 1945 in Hamburg by bombs from the USAAF.

References

Bibliography

External links

German Type VIIC submarines
U-boats commissioned in 1943
U-boats sunk in 1945
U-boats sunk by US aircraft
1943 ships
Ships built in Emden
World War II submarines of Germany
Maritime incidents in March 1945